Indianola is an unincorporated community in Lowndes County, in the U.S. state of Georgia.

History
A post office called Indianola was established in 1901, and remained in operation until 1915. Indianola was so named for the Native American Indians who once dwelt in the area.

References

Unincorporated communities in Lowndes County, Georgia